Spanish and Portuguese Synagogue may refer to:

Bevis Marks Synagogue in the City of London
Congregation Shearith Israel, often called The Spanish and Portuguese Synagogue, in New York
Spanish and Portuguese Synagogue of Montreal
Portuguese Synagogue (Amsterdam)

For other Spanish and Portuguese synagogues, see Spanish and Portuguese Jews#Communities, past and present